Mountain View Cemetery (also known as Resthaven Crypts and Niches) is a cemetery in Ashland, Oregon, in the United States. It was listed on the National Register of Historic Places in 1994 "in recognition of its historic significance and fine array of mortuary art and craftsmanship". In 2013, the cemetery was listed with the Oregon Commission on Historical Cemeteries.

See also

 National Register of Historic Places listings in Jackson County, Oregon

References

External links
 
 
 
 

Ashland, Oregon
Cemeteries on the National Register of Historic Places in Oregon
National Register of Historic Places in Jackson County, Oregon